Maria Hummel is an American writer. Her poetry collection, House and Fire, was winner of the 2013 APR/Hickman First Book Prize. She has written three novels: Still Lives (Counterpoint, 2018), Motherland (Counterpoint, 2014) and Wilderness Run (St. Martin's, 2003).

Publishers Weekly gave her novel, Motherland, a starred review and wrote that "Fear, grief, and the will to survive fuse in this beautiful novel about the inner life of a German family in the final months of World War II...." People wrote that Motherland is "searing and honest, her book illuminates the reality of war away from the front lines ... with a compassion and depth of understanding that will touch your heart.

Hummel was a Wallace Stegner fellow from 2005 to 2007 at Stanford University, where she was a Jones Lecturer from 2009 to 2016. Since 2016, she has taught in the English department at the University of Vermont.

Works
Wilderness Run, St Martin's Press, 2002, 
Motherland, Counterpoint, 2014, 
Still Lives, Counterpoint, June 2018,

References

American women poets
American women novelists
Living people
Year of birth missing (living people)
21st-century American novelists
21st-century American poets
21st-century American women writers
Stegner Fellows
Stanford University faculty